Celosia nitida (or Celosia texana) is commonly known as West Indian cock's comb. It is a native perennial in Texas and Florida, though in Florida, it is currently listed as an endangered species. It is also found in Central and South America. The plant can grow up to 2 m (6 feet) in height, and flowers in fall to winter.

References

USDA Plant Profile
Celosia nitida

nitida
Taxa named by Martin Vahl
Flora of Florida
Flora of Texas